In probability theory, a transition rate matrix (also known as an intensity matrix or infinitesimal generator matrix) is an array of numbers describing the instantaneous rate at which a continuous time Markov chain transitions between states.

In a transition rate matrix Q (sometimes written A) element qij (for i ≠ j) denotes the rate departing from i and arriving in state j. Diagonal elements qii are defined such that 

and therefore the rows of the matrix sum to zero (see condition 3 in the definition section).

Definition
A transition rate matrix  satisfies the following conditions

 
 
 
Up to a global sign, a large class of examples of such matrices is provided by the Laplacian of a directed, weighted graph. The vertices of the graph correspond to the Markov chain's states.

Properties
The transition rate matrix has following properties: 
 All other eigenvalues  fulfill .
 All eigenvectors  with a non-zero eigenvalue fulfill .

Example
An M/M/1 queue, a model which counts the number of jobs in a queueing system with arrivals at rate λ and services at rate μ, has transition rate matrix

See also 

 Stochastic matrix

References

Markov processes

Matrices